Krazy Kat & Ignatz Mouse Discuss the Letter 'G' is a 1916 silent short animated film featuring the comic strip character Krazy Kat. As with other animated shorts at the time, it was featured as an extra along with news reports that were released on film.

Plot
Krazy is a chef who works in a bistro. His customer is none other than Ignatz. Ignatz orders slices of roast duck with some gravy. Krazy serves the order, and even includes a whole pizza as a bonus. He then talks to the mouse about the way a lot of well-known people wear names beginning with 'G'. Ignatz, however, does not believe in the trend, and therefore asks the cat to name a few individuals who share it. Krazy gives "G. Washington" as an example, although the others such as "G. Rusalem" (Jerusalem) and "G. Hosafat" (Jehosaphat) sound more like puns. Krazy then offers Ignatz one more bonus in a large strawberry pie. Ignatz finds the subject rather ludicrous as the cynical mouse splats the pie on the cat. Though flat on his front and covered in jam, Krazy is pretty quiet on the matter.

See also
 Krazy Kat filmography

References

External links
Krazy Kat & Ignatz Mouse Discuss the Letter G at the Big Cartoon Database

1916 films
American silent short films
American black-and-white films
1910s animated short films
Krazy Kat shorts
Cooking films
Animated films about mice
1910s American animated films
American animated short films
1916 short films
1916 animated films
Films set in restaurants